Two Royal Navy ships have carried the name HMS Pactolus, after
the river in which, according to legend, King Midas washed his hands to divest himself of the golden touch.

 The first  was a frigate built in 1813 that was decommissioned in 1817.
 The second  was a  built in 1896 and sold for scrap in 1921.

Royal Navy ship names